The Arrival from the Darkness aka Redivivus is a 1921 Czechoslovak silent fantasy horror film directed by Jan S. Kolár.

Production
Exteriors were shot at castles Karlštejn, Český Šternberk and Okoř. Studio scenes were shot at EFA-Atelier am Zoo in Berlin in sets made by art director Fritz Kraenke.

Cast
Theodor Pištěk as Landowner Bohdan Dražický
Anny Ondra as Farmer's wife Dagmar/Alena
Karel Lamač as Ješek Dražický of Lom and Střehov, Alena's cousin
Josef Šváb-Malostranský as Old servant Jan
Vladimír Majeras Richard Bor/Alchemist Balthazar del Borro
Luigi Hofman as Buttler/Alena's father
Jan W. Speerger as Knight from a company of Ješek Dražický
Alfred Baštýř as Fisherman
Rudolf Myzet as Knight

Release
The film was released in cinemas in Germany, Austria, France and Great Britain under the name Redivivus in 1921.

From 2005 to 2007, the film was reconstructed and shown in film festivals. It was released in a DVD box set with six other Kolár's silent films by Czech Film Archive in 2018.

References

External links 
 

1921 films
1920s fantasy films
1920s historical horror films
Czechoslovak black-and-white films
Czech silent films
Czech fantasy films
Czech horror films
Czechoslovak horror films
Films about time travel
Films shot in the Czech Republic
1921 horror films
Czech dark fantasy films